Anuja Sathe Gokhale is an Indian actress, mainly working in Indian film industry. She is married to actor Saurabh Gokhale.

Career
Anuja began her career as a theater artist, working in numerous popular Marathi plays such as Shobha Yatra and Uttar Ratra. She then progressed to Marathi television and then Marathi mainstream cinema, and more recently Bollywood. She played the leading role as Dhara in the primetime soap opera Tamanna, on Star Plus channel; this was her first Hindi TV show. She was seen in the historical period series Peshwa Bajirao as the mother of Bajirao, Radhabai. She was also seen in Khoob Ladi Mardaani... Jhansi Ki Rani as JankiBai. She essayed the role of a mafia queen in the web-series Ek thi Begum which streamed on MX player.

Personal life 
Sathe met Saurabh Gokhale, another Marathi actor, on the sets of her show Mandala Don Ghadicha Dav. The couple tied the knot in 2013.

Filmography
Films

Television

References

External links
 

1987 births
Living people
Marathi people
Actresses from Mumbai
Actresses from Pune
21st-century Indian actresses
Indian film actresses
Actresses in Marathi cinema
Actresses in Hindi cinema
Actresses in Hindi television
Indian television actresses
Indian soap opera actresses
Indian stage actresses